David Gonzalez (born 29 December 1974) is an Australian handball player. He competed in the men's tournament at the 2000 Summer Olympics.

References

1974 births
Living people
Australian male handball players
Olympic handball players of Australia
Handball players at the 2000 Summer Olympics
Sportspeople from Santander, Spain